The 11th Hour (also known as I Am Here) is a 2014 American drama film directed and written by Anders Morgenthaler and starring Kim Basinger and Jordan Prentice. The film was released on VOD.

Plot
Hamburg-based businesswoman Maria, in her 40s, has achieved everything in her job and is married, but her being childless makes her unhappy. After another miscarriage, she learns that she will never be a mother of her life because of her age. Maria decides to check a rumor that prostitutes in Eastern Europe may sell their newborns for money. In search of a woman who could sell her a baby, Maria gets deeper and deeper into the dark world of prostitution and human trafficking. Soon, she faces serious problems as she is confronted by a brutal Russian criminal.

Cast

 Kim Basinger as Maria
 Jordan Prentice as Petit
 Sebastian Schipper as Peter
 Peter Stormare as The Russian

Reception

Critical response
To date, The 11th Hour only has a 13 percent rating on Rotten Tomatoes and a 32 score on Metacritic. IndieWire felt that Kim Basinger "does what she can with [The 11th Hour] material, but that's not much".

References

External links
 
 
 

2014 films
English-language German films
English-language Danish films
2014 drama films
German pregnancy films
Films directed by Anders Morgenthaler
Films scored by Jóhann Jóhannsson
Films about prostitution in Germany
Films about child prostitution
Films about human trafficking
German thriller films
Danish thriller films
Films set in Hamburg
Films shot in Hamburg
Films set in the Czech Republic
Danish crime thriller films
Films about the Russian Mafia
2014 psychological thriller films
Films about drugs
Films about businesspeople
2010s pregnancy films
Nordisk Film films
Films about marriage
Films about con artists
Films about dwarfs
2010s psychological drama films
2014 independent films
2010s English-language films
2010s survival films
2010s German films